Hygrocybe nigrescens, commonly known as the blackening wax-cap, is a mushroom of the waxcap genus Hygrocybe. It is found in Europe and Africa.

See also
List of Hygrocybe species

References

External links

Fungi described in 1883
Fungi of Europe
cantharellus